A hotel is an establishment that provides paid lodging on a short-term basis.

Hotel may also refer to:

Arts, entertainment, and media

Films
 Hotel (1967 film), based on the Hailey novel and starring Rod Taylor
 Hotel (2001 film), by Mike Figgis
 Hotel (2004 film), by Jessica Hausner
 Hotel!, a 2001 TV spoof comedy movie starring Paul McGann
 Hotell, a 2013 Swedish film
 Hotel (1981 film), a Bollywood film

Games
 Hotel (board game), a 1987 board game manufactured by Milton Bradley
 Hotel Dusk: Room 215, a 2007 Nintendo DS game by Nintendo
 Hotel Mario, a famous 1994 game from Phillips and is used as an Internet meme

Literature
 Hotel (Hailey novel), a 1965 novel by Arthur Hailey
 Hotel (Walsh book), a 2015 book by Joanna Walsh
 Hotel, a 2014 play by Polly Stenham
 Hotels (magazine), published by Reed Business Information
 The Hotel (novel), a 1927 novel by Elizabeth Bowen

Music
 Hotel (band), an American rock band

Albums
 Hotel (album), by Moby, 2005
Hotels, an EP by Windsor Airlift, 2005

Songs
 "Hotel" (Cassidy song), 2004
 "Hotel" (Kid Ink song), 2015
 "Hotel" (Kita Alexander song), 2017
 "Hotel", by Lawsy, 2022
 "Hotel" (Koda Kumi song), 2014
 "Hotel", by The Antlers from Familiars, 2014
 "Hotel", by City Sleeps from Not an Angel, 2007
 "Hotel", by Toby Fox, a track from the soundtrack of the 2015 video game Undertale
 "Hotel", by Tori Amos from From the Choirgirl Hotel, 1998
 "Hotels", by Juliana Hatfield from Beautiful Creature, 2000
 "Hotels", by Medina from Forever, 2012

Television
 Hotel (American TV series), also based on the Hailey novel, a television series aired in the United States from 1983 until 1988
 Hotel (British TV series), a 1997 British television documentary programme about the Britannia Adelphi Hotel that aired on BBC
 Hotel (Hong Kong TV series), a 1976 Hong Kong television series
 American Horror Story: Hotel (2015),  the fifth installment of the anthology show, set in the fictional Hotel Cortez of Los Angeles
 The Hotel (Singaporean TV series), a Singapore Chinese-language drama
 The Hotel (British TV series), a 2011 British documentary television programme broadcast on Channel 4
"Hotel" (Bluey), an episode of the first season of the animated TV series Bluey

Other uses
 Hotel, pronunciation of the letter "H" in the NATO phonetic alphabet
 Australian pub, sometimes known as a hotel, which may or may not provide paid lodging on a short-term basis
 Hotel class, a type of Soviet nuclear submarine
 Hôtel de Ville, a French city hall
 Hôtel particulier, a grand French townhouse

See also
 Grand Hotel (disambiguation)
 Hotel California (disambiguation)
 Hotelier (disambiguation)
 Hotels.com